The Asociación de Fútbol de Cuba is the official governing body of the sport of football in Cuba including the National Team. The league is composed of one amateur division with total of 8 teams.

Association staff

Notable former players
 Yénier Márquez most-capped player of the Cuba national team
 Eduardo Sebrango Vancouver Whitecaps, later Montreal Impact
 Mario Inchausti (3 June 1915 – 2 May 2006) was a Cuban footballer who played in Spain for Real Zaragoza, Real Betis and Real Madrid, before retiring in 1942 due to injury.
 Héctor Socorro scorer of three goals in the 1938 FIFA World Cup helping Cuba reach the quarterfinals where they lost to Sweden.

See also

Cuba National Football Team

References

External links
 Cuba at the FIFA website
 Cuba at CONCACAF site

CONCACAF member associations
Football in Cuba
Football
1924 establishments in Cuba
Sports organizations established in 1924